Liceo José Victorino Lastarria is a Chilean high school located in Santiago, Santiago Metropolitan Region, Chile. It was established in June 1913.

References 

1913 establishments in Chile
Educational institutions established in 1913
secondary schools in Chile
schools in Santiago Metropolitan Region